is a song by Japanese rock band High and Mighty Color. The song was released as the second and final single from the band's second album Gō on Progressive on January 16, 2006.

Overview
"Ichirin no Hana" is the band's sixth single. It retained number two in the Oricon charts for most of the week of its release, making it the group's biggest hit since "Over", and even surpassed that single in sales. It is a rock song, blended with some rapping from Yūsuke. "Ichirin no Hana" was used as the third opening theme for the anime adaption of Bleach and was certified gold for shipments of over 100,000 by the RIAJ in January 2006. The title of the song is translated to English as "a single flower"

Track list
 "Ichirin no Hana" – 3:40
 "Warped Reflection" – 4:07
 "Ichirin no Hana ~Huge Hollow Mix~" (remixed by DT of  NATM3) – 4:37
 "Ichirin no Hana (Less Vocal Track)" – 3:40

All songs written by High and Mighty Color.

Production
 Hide2 (Norishrocks) – creative & art direction
 Tsousie (Jetrock Graphics) – art direction & design
 Ryuichi Tamura (Norishrocks) – co-art design
 Rocca Works – costume
 Eiji Tanaki (D&N Planning) – styling
 Keiko Nakatani (Mingle) – hair and make-up
 Atsushi Otaki (Ad Force), Masahiro Aoki (D&N Planning), Noriko Yamashita (SMC) & Kaori"Kacch" Nagai (Norishrocks) – products coordination

TV Performances 
 January 13, 2006 - Music Fighter
 January 14, 2006 - CDTV
 January 20, 2006 - Music Station
 January 27, 2006 - PopJam
 January 28, 2006 - Melodix!

Charts

References

  Translated Lyrics
   

2006 singles
High and Mighty Color songs
Anime soundtracks
Bleach (manga) songs